

Galicia 
The top team will promoted to 2015–16 Segunda División (women).

Top scorers

Asturias
The top team will promoted to 2015–16 Segunda División (women).

Castille and León
The top team will promoted to 2015–16 Segunda División (women).

Top scorers

Cantabria
The top team will promoted to 2015–16 Segunda División (women).

Top scorers

Basque Country
The top team will promoted to 2015–16 Segunda División (women).

Top scorers

Navarra
The top team will promoted to 2015–16 Segunda División (women).

La Rioja
The top team will promoted to 2015–16 Segunda División (women).

Top scorers

Aragón
The top team will promoted to 2015–16 Segunda División (women).

Territorial 1

Territorial 2

Promotion

Catalunya
The top team will promoted to 2015–16 Segunda División (women).

Balearic Islands
The top team will promoted to 2015–16 Segunda División (women).

Top scorers

Valencian Community
The top team will promoted to 2015–16 Segunda División (women).

Top scorers

Región de Murcia
The top team will promoted to 2015–16 Segunda División (women).

Top scorers

Andalusia
The top team will promoted to 2015–16 Segunda División (women).

Almería

Top scorer: Laura Gª Delgado (Comarca Río Nacimiento), 23 goals

Granada

Top Scorer: Sara Grez. Echeverría (CD Numancia), 17 goals

Huelva

Top scorer: Diana González (Sporting de Huelva), 25 goals

Sevilla

Top scorer: Rosario Díaz Hueso (Sevilla FC), 26 goals

Cádiz

Top scorer: Celenia Afán (Jérez Industrial CF), 17 goals

Córdoba

Top scorer: Mar Villarreal (CD Pozoalbense), 17 goals

Jaén

Top scorer: Jessica Agea (Atlético Jiennense), 7 goals

Málaga

Top scorer: Cristina Moneo (FB Torreño), 24 goals

Promotion

Tor scorer: Diana González (Sporting de Huelva): 4 goals

Extremadura
The top team will promoted to 2015–16 Segunda División (women).

Group 1:

Top scorers

Group 2:

Top scorers

Promotion

Top scorer: Sheila Fdez. Bautista (EF Peña El Valle): 4 goals

Castilla-La Mancha
The top team will promoted to 2015–16 Segunda División (women).

Top scorers

Comunidad de Madrid
The top team will promoted to 2015–16 Segunda División (women).

Top scorers

Ceuta

See also
Ligas Regionales (Spanish women's football)

References

3
Ligas Regionales (Spanish women's football)
Seasons in Spanish women's football competitions